Neanderthal man is an extinct human of the genus Homo.

Neanderthal man may also refer to:

 The Neanderthal Man (1953), science-fiction film made in the United States
 "Neanderthal Man" (song) (1970), by English band Hotlegs
 Neanderthal Man: In Search of Lost Genomes (2014), memoir by Neanderthal researcher Svante Pääbo

See also 
 Neanderthal (disambiguation)